Branan Murphy (born August 13, 1986) is a pop vocalist, rapper, songwriter and producer signed to Paravel Records / Dream Records.

Career 
Henry “Hank” Branan Murphy grew up in Louisville, GA, first listening to The Beach Boys as a kid and then writing songs and singing in church while in high school. By age 18, he released two independent projects. After moving to Raleigh-Durham, NC in 2011 he released a mixtape called SMPLFY resulting in signing with Sony/Provident's Essential Records.

On April 21, 2017, Murphy released his first single on Sony, "All the Wrong Things." Murphy says about the song, "…I write songs about what it’s like to be human – my own brand of ‘conscious pop’. We are all complex people. We have struggles. We have contradictions. We have deep desires. We are all seeking to be loved, understood and satisfied. My songs attempt to capture those deep emotional, even spiritual, yearnings we have as human beings. The bottom line is that I want to make great art, but most of all I want to be honest. I want to sing about what people are really going through…". The song featured Grammy Award nominee Koryn Hawthorne.

On September 22nd, 2017 Murphy released his second single "Enough" with producer JordanSapp.

Murphy's third single, "Talk About It" was released March 16, 2018, peaking at #37 on the Billboard Airplay Chart.

On September 14, 2018 Murphy released a six-song collection featuring two new tunes, the previously unreleased hip-hop collaboration "Top of the World," featuring Reflection Music Group's Canon and COBRA producer JuiceBangers and "Maybe" along with four previously released tunes that collectively had amassed four+ million streams in just under 16 months: "All The Wrong Things (feat. Grammy Nominated Koryn Hawthorne)," "Enough," "Talk About It" and "My Life." Launching alongside the EP were two new music videos; the multi-format single "My Life," and "Top of the World".

On January 18, 2019, Branan released his fourth radio single "Coming Home".

Discography

Albums
 Who Am I? (2019)

EPs
 Branan Murphy (2018)
 Better King (2021)

Singles

References

External links
 

1986 births
Musical groups
Musical groups
Essential Records (Christian) artists
Living people